Koloskovo is the name of three different rural localities in [[Russia
Koloskovo, Belgorod Oblast, a village and the administrative center of Koloskovskoye of Valuysky District, Belgorod Oblast
Koloskovo, Leningrad Oblast, a settlement in Sosnovskoye Rural Settlement of Priozersky District, Leningrad Oblast
Koloskovo, Nizhny Novgorod Oblast, a village in Semyonovsky Urban Okrug, Nizhny Novgorod Oblast